Back Home is the eighth studio album by American singer Trey Songz. It was released on October 9, 2020, by Atlantic Records.

The album was supported by five official singles: "Back Home", the protest anthem "2020 Riots: How Many Times", as a response to the police murder of George Floyd, "Circles", "Two Ways" and "On Call". The title track, featuring Summer Walker, reached number 12 on the R&B/Hip-Hop Airplay chart. The album also features appearances from Ty Dolla Sign, Davido, and Swae Lee.

The album peaked at number 15 on the US Billboard 200, becoming his second lowest charting album, following his debut album I Gotta Make It.

Background 
Trey Songz affirmed that on Back Home he "wanted to lay down even more heavy the R&B presence of love". The singer worked the album in his hometown in Virginia, and according to him, that helped him work on it with less expectations. Talking about its making he said:

Critical reception 

Andy Kellman of AllMusic said that Back Home "is weighed down by a glut of adequate slow jams that don't offer much variation, though his voice can still elevate middling material". Roisin O'Connor of The Independent on the album the singer "seems remarkably preoccupied by his romantic relationships, and less interested in delving into his own past".

Track listing

Charts

References

2020 albums
Trey Songz albums
Atlantic Records albums
Albums produced by Troy Taylor (record producer)